Stewarts Creek Township is one of fifteen townships in Surry County, North Carolina, United States. The township had a population of 5,653 according to the 2000 census.

Geographically, Stewarts Creek Township occupies  in northern Surry County, with its northern border shared with the state of Virginia.  There are no incorporated municipalities within Stewarts Creek Township; however, there are several smaller, unincorporated communities located here, including Bottom, Crooked Oak, Pine Ridge and Round Peak.

Townships in Surry County, North Carolina
Townships in North Carolina